The Marshall Super Lead Model 1959 is a guitar amplifier head made by Marshall. One of the famous Marshall Plexis, it was introduced in 1965 and with its associated 4×12″ cabinets gave rise to the "Marshall stack".

History
The 1959 (Marshall's identifying numbers are not years of manufacture), produced from 1965 to 1976 (when it was replaced by the 2203 "Master Volume"), is an amplifier in Marshall's "Standard" series. It was designed by Ken Bran and Dudley Craven after The Who's guitarist Pete Townshend asked Marshall for a 100 watt amplifier. Its output was first channeled into an 8×12″ cabinet, but that single, unwieldy cabinet was quickly changed to a pair of 4x12″ cabinets, 1960a "angled" on top and 1960b "box" on bottom, creating the famous "Marshall full stack". The amplifier also came as a PA and a bass version.

The Plexiglas panel led to the name "Plexi", and while 50-watt models of the time are also called Plexis, the 1959 100 watt model is generally thought of as the "definitive" Plexi. The panels were actually made from much tougher polycarbonate plastic, but to the average American observer, it looked like the more familiar Plexiglas, and the name stuck. 

In 1969, Marshall replaced the Plexiglas panel with one of brushed black metal with gold aluminum piping. There were other modifications: In 1966, the KT66 tubes of the JTM-models were replaced with EL34. After 1976, the plate voltages were lowered slightly for improved reliability. But during the 1970s, Marshall's increasing exports overseas led to a problem: Often the EL34 tubes would break during transportation, to the point where amps began being shipped from the factory with more rugged Tung-Sol 6550 tubes, which are "stiffer and not as harmonically rich" as the EL34 tubes.

Reissues
The amplifier was reissued for the first time in 1988 (the 1959S), and again from 1991 to 1993 (the 1959X) and from 1993 to 1995 (the 1959SLP).  The SLP continued after 1995 but in 2000 Marshall added modifications to lower the noise floor (hum balance pot), reverted the negative feedback resistor to the 1968-69 value of 47 kΩ, and added an effects loop. The 1959SLP was sold until 2017. In 2005 Marshall introduced the 1959HW (for "hand-wired"), based on the 1967–1969 models, with negative feedback added corresponding to the 1969 model. This amplifier was called "expensive but good." Guitar Player magazine called the 1959 "monumentally huge, frightfully loud, and painfully expensive", and its review of the 1959HW said it was "quick, percussive, articulate," and required a "total commitment to volume."

Technical specifications
The 1959 had 100 watts of power, two channels, and four inputs. They were equipped with four KT66 tubes, but models made after 1967 had four EL34 tubes instead; it had three ECC83 tubes in the pre-amplification stage. A model with tremolo, the 1959T, was available until 1973.

The lead channel has a boosted bright tone, and the rhythm channel has a flatter response. Each channel has a high and a low gain input; the low gain input is attenuated by 6 dB. The channels can be linked with an instrument cable, a technique sometimes referred to as "jumping" and used to feed the same instrument through both channels simultaneously, for increased gain.

Notable early users
Besides Pete Townshend of The Who, early users include Eric Clapton, who in 1966, when he founded Cream, traded in his famous Bluesbreaker combo for a 1959 Plexi, and Jimi Hendrix, who used a 1959 with four 4×12″ cabinets (his "couple of great refrigerators") at the 1969 Woodstock Festival and established the Marshall as the "definitive rock amp".

Other notable users 
 Dickey Betts
 Vinnie Moore
 Duane Allman
 John Frusciante
 Angus Young
 Malcolm Young
 Eddie Van Halen
 Billie Joe Armstrong
 Jason White
 Jimi Hendrix
 Wayne Kramer
 Fred Smith
 Ron Asheton
 Graham Coxon
 Jimmy Page
 Johnny Ramone
 Pete Townshend
 Ace Frehley
 Billy Gibbons
 J Mascis
 Matt Bellamy
 Randy Rhoads
 Steeve Thomas
 Yngwie Malmsteen
 George Lynch
 Uli Jon Roth
 Richie Kotzen
 Slash
 Richie Blackmore
 Simon Neil

References

Instrument amplifiers
Marshall amplifiers
Valve amplifiers